Manning Clark's History of Australia – The Musical is an Australian musical by Tim Robertson and Don Watson with John Romeril with music by Martin Armiger and George Dreyfus with David King. Written to coincide with the Australian Bicentenary, the musical interweaves the life of historian Manning Clark from 1915 to 1988 with Australian history from 1788 to 1915, utilising drama, melodrama, music, song, comedy and circus.

Development
Watson, Robertson and Romeril began working on a stage adaptation of Clark's (then) five volume A History of Australia in 1983.

Production history
The original production opened at Melbourne's Princess Theatre on 16 January 1988, produced by John Timlin with investors including the Hoyts Corporation and Qantas, as part of Australian Bicentenary celebrations. It was directed by John Bell with choreography by Mark Daly and musical direction by David King. The cast included Ivar Kants, Michele Fawdon, John McTernan, Jonathan Biggins, Greg Stone, Linda Nagle, Kate Turner, Helen Noonan, Tina Bursill, Jenny Vuletic, Bob Hornery, Carmen Tanti, Ross Williams, Terry Brady, Darryl Emmerson, Geoffrey Jenkins and Ingrid Silveus.

Negative initial reviews and poor ticket sales resulted in the musical facing closure after three weeks. In an effort to continue, the cast agreed to forgo wages, the theatre owner waived the rent and Hoyts provided free publicity. History of Australia finally closed in late February 1988, well short of initial expectations and without proceeding to a national tour.

A cast recording was released by Polydor in 1988.

Critical reception
The musical received a mixed critical reaction. In Melbourne newspaper The Age, theatre critic Leonard Radic said the musical gave an overall impression of "patchiness and a failure of imagination". Playwright Jack Hibberd called Radic's review "disrespectful, captious and harsh" and "choked with terrible misjudgements".

Musical numbers
"One Story"
"We Are They"
"Sons of Enlightenment"
"Nance the Ferret"
"The Wentworth Samba"
"The Cricket Song"
"There Is No Love" (inc. "Inaugural Orgy of NSW")
"We in the Shadows"
"Spirit of the Place"
"Gold"
"Parp Parp"
"The Kelly Gang Song"
"Reedy River"
"Louisa's Song"
"Tailoresses" (inc. "Faces in the Street")
"The Unknown Soldier"
"Gallipolli"
"Louisa Underscore"
"Song of the Republic"

Musical numbers taken from the cast recording

Orchestrations:  Martin Armiger, Sharon Calcraft, Duncan Cameron, Ashley Irwin, David King, Derek Williams.

References

External links
Manning Clark's History of Australia at AusStage
"We in the Shadows" from History of Australia performed by Geraldine Turner on YouTube
"The Unknown Soldier" from History of Australia performed by Philip Quast on YouTube
A History of Australia The Musical, A History (website by Tim Robertson about the musical including the libretto)

Australian musicals
1988 musicals